Ronnie ("Ron") de Groot (born March 29, 1960 in Nijmegen, Gelderland) is a retired football midfielder  from the Netherlands, who mainly played for NEC Nijmegen (1979–1987) during his professional career. After his retirement – he was just 27 when he had to stop due to an ankle injury – De Groot started to work as an assistant coach for NEC Nijmegen.

References
  Profile

1960 births
Living people
Dutch footballers
Dutch football managers
Association football midfielders
NEC Nijmegen players
Footballers from Nijmegen
NEC Nijmegen managers